Bryce Canyon City, sometimes shown as Bryce on maps, is a town in Garfield County, Utah, United States, adjacent to Bryce Canyon National Park. The town, formerly known as Ruby's Inn, was officially incorporated on July 23, 2007 under a short-lived state law. The population was 198 at the 2010 census.

Geography
The town lies alongside Utah State Route 63, near the park's popular Sunset Point. The town limits extend north to Utah State Route 12 at the north end of Route 63.

Climate
The climate in this area has mild differences between highs and lows, and there is adequate rainfall year-round.  According to the Köppen Climate Classification system, Bryce has a marine west coast climate, abbreviated "Cfb" on climate maps.

History
Reuben C. "Ruby" Syrett built a lodge and cabins at this location in 1916, when the promotion of Bryce Canyon for tourism was just beginning. Syrett's business grew along with the park's popularity, particularly once it was made a national park in 1928. Ruby's Inn became an important junction; its travelers' services developed into a small community. Syrett donated land to the state for construction of a road (now Utah State Route 63), strategically placing Ruby's Inn right at the entrance to the park.

In 2007, the Utah State Legislature unanimously passed H.B. 466, a bill that amended the state law on petitions to incorporate a town. The new provisions allowed a petition for a new town with 100–999 residents to be filed with just the signatures of the owners of a majority of the land area, even a single majority landowner. If the petition met the conditions of state law and its signers owned the majority of the land by value, the new law required the county government to grant the petition and appoint a mayor and town council from a list of individuals approved by the petitioners.

The Syrett family, owners of Ruby's Inn, had been seeking municipal incorporation for some time, hoping to qualify for a portion of county sales tax revenue to help fund the water system and other community infrastructure. They jumped at the opportunity to incorporate under the new law, filing a new petition soon after its passage. Garfield County officials had repeatedly denied the request for a new town, unwilling to give up some 10 percent of the county budget. County officials discovered, however, that they no longer had any option under the provisions of H.B. 466; the petition was in order, and they were required to grant it. On July 23, 2007, Bryce Canyon City became the first town incorporated under the amended law. In fact, it was the only one before the legislature amended the law again in early 2008. Three other Utah towns that already had petitions pending, Hideout, Independence, and Powder Mountain, were grandfathered in, but under the 2008 law there must be at least five petition sponsors, who were not allowed themselves to own more than 40 percent of the land. The new law also granted the county government more authority in the process, and required the town government to be elected.

Demographics

Bryce Canyon City is one of the few population centers in a sparsely populated, rural area. At incorporation, the officially estimated population was 138. A majority of the residents are members of the Syrett family, and nearly all of the adults are employees of Ruby's Inn. The year-round population is only a fraction of the people who occupy the town at the peak of tourist season, when employment swells to 600, and the number of visitors is in the thousands, more than the total population of Garfield County.

As of the census of 2010, there were 198 people living in the town. There were 118 housing units. The racial makeup of the town was 62.6% White, 0.5% Black or African American, 4.5% American Indian and Alaska Native, 18.7% Asian, 12.6% from some other race, and 1.0% from two or more races. Hispanic or Latino of any race were 24.2% of the population.

Government
Bryce Canyon City is a company town, consisting solely of the property of Ruby's Inn and the Syrett family, its third-generation owners. Rod Syrett, the company's board president, was chosen as the first mayor.

References

External links

 Official site

Towns in Garfield County, Utah
Towns in Utah
Company towns in Utah
Populated places established in 1916
1916 establishments in Utah